Malibu is a locality in the Canadian province of British Columbia's Sunshine Coast district. This place may also be referred to as Malibu Islet and Malibu Rapids. This was the site of the Malibu Club, formerly a private resort which is today a Young Life camp.

Malibu is at the mouth of the Princess Louisa Inlet and Swaywelat Sechelt Bands 12 and 12A. It is only accessible by boat or by seaplane.

History
Thomas F. Hamilton began construction of the Malibu Club in 1940, named after his yacht, the MV Malibu. This was the first of a planned series of resorts throughout Princess Louisa Inlet. The club opened in July 1941, but its operations were suspended until the end of World War II in 1945. From that point until 1950, the facility was open as a premium resort. Visitors included John Wayne, Senator John F. Kennedy, Barbara Stanwyck, Bing Crosby, and Bob Hope. The club faced financial problems due to the limited transportation access and the limited two-month window of good weather. In 1948, a polio death and related quarantine further damaged business prospects. Hamilton's Malibu Club was closed in 1950.

Young Life, a Christian association, agreed to purchase the facilities from Hamilton in December 1953 and has operated the Malibu Club facility since. Hamilton had put a $1 million price tag on the property, but sold it to Jim Rayburn, the founder of Young Life, for $300,000 after visiting other Young Life camps in the area.

Climate

Footnotes

References
 Hitz, Charles W. (2003). "Through the Rapids - The History of Princess Louisa Inlet", Sitka 2 Publishing, Kirkland, WA. .

External links
  
Young Life Malibu Club
Tides at Malibu
Malibu Hydro Web Site

Populated places in the Sunshine Coast Regional District
Summer camps in Canada